Phyllolobium is a genus of flowering plants belonging to the family Fabaceae.

Its native range is Central Asia to Himalaya and China.

Species:

Phyllolobium balfourianum 
Phyllolobium camptodontum 
Phyllolobium chapmanianum 
Phyllolobium chinense 
Phyllolobium dolichochaete 
Phyllolobium donianum 
Phyllolobium enneaphyllum 
Phyllolobium eutrichus 
Phyllolobium flavovirens 
Phyllolobium heydei 
Phyllolobium lachungense 
Phyllolobium lasaense 
Phyllolobium lineariaurifer 
Phyllolobium milingense 
Phyllolobium pastorium 
Phyllolobium petri-primi 
Phyllolobium prodigiosum 
Phyllolobium sanbilingense 
Phyllolobium siccaneum 
Phyllolobium sichuanense 
Phyllolobium tanguticum 
Phyllolobium tingriense 
Phyllolobium tribulifolium 
Phyllolobium turgidocarpum

References

Galegeae
Fabaceae genera
Fabales of Asia